Alan David Blakley (1 April 1942 – 1 June 1996) was a British musician and record producer, known as the rhythm guitarist and keyboard player with the Tremeloes and co-writer of most of their hits until January 1975, when he started writing for other bands. His credits include co-writing (with Len Hawkes) various hits for the Tremeloes, co-producing the UK No. 42 hit "She's Gonna Win", with Bilbo, and co-producing singles and albums by Mungo Jerry with the group's leader, Ray Dorset. He subsequently rejoined the Tremeloes until forced to retire for health reasons.

Personal life
Blakley married actress Lin Blakley, and they had two daughters: Claudie Blakley and Kirsten Blakley. His brother Mike Blakley was also a musician, and a drummer in the band Christie.

Blakley died of cancer in June 1996, aged 54.

Discography

References

External links

1942 births
1996 deaths
Deaths from cancer
English pop guitarists
English male guitarists
English songwriters
English record producers
Musicians from Kent
People from Bromley
20th-century English musicians
20th-century British guitarists
20th-century British male musicians
20th-century British businesspeople
British male songwriters